Elections to Wigan Council were held on 1 May 2008. One-third of the council was up for election.

Election result

This result had the following consequences for the total number of seats on the Council after the elections:

Ward results

Abram

Ashton

Aspull New Springs Whelley

Astley Mosley Common

Atherleigh

Atherton

Bryn

Douglas

Golborne Lowton West

Hindley

Hindley Green

Ince

Leigh East

Leigh South

Leigh West

Lowton East

Orrell

Pemberton

Shevington with Lower Ground

Standish with Langtree

Tyldesley

Wigan Central

Wigan West

Winstanley

Worsley Mesnes

By-elections between 2008 and 2010

References

Wigan Council election, 2008 - nominations

2008 English local elections
2008
2000s in Greater Manchester